Kirakos , also spelled Giragos or Guiragos in Western Armenian, is an Armenian given name derived from the Greek Cyriacus. It may refer to:

Kirakos
Kirakos Gandzaketsi (c. 1200/1202–1271), Armenian historian of the 13th century and author of the History of Armenia
Kirakos (Giragos) I Virapetsi of Armenia, Catholicos of the Armenian Apostolic Church (1441–1443)  residing as first Catholicos of the Mother See of Holy Echmiadzin and All Armenians. See list
Kirakos I of Cilicia, Catholicos of the Holy See of Cilicia (1797–1822). See list
Kirakos II of Cilicia, Catholicos of the Holy See of Cilicia (1855–1866) See list

Giragos
Giragos (coadjutor) to Armenian Patriarch of Jerusalem Krikor III (13th century). See list
Giragos I of Constantinople, Armenian Patriarch of Constantinople (1641–1642). See list
Giragos I of Jerusalem, Armenian Patriarch of Jerusalem (1846–1850). See list

Guiragos
Guiragos, Lebanese football player

See also
St. Giragos Armenian Church, an Armenian Apostolic church in Diyarbakır, Turkey
Kirakosik, literally small Kirakos, an earlier name of Ashotavan, a village in the Sisian Municipality of the Syunik Province in Armenia.
Kirakosyan, disambiguation
Cyriacus, disambiguation